Dodovic Owiny (born 8 May 1954) is a Ugandan boxer. He competed in the men's heavyweight event at the 1984 Summer Olympics. In his first fight, he beat Michael Kenny of New Zealand, before losing to Willie deWit of Canada in the next round.

References

1954 births
Living people
Ugandan male boxers
Olympic boxers of Uganda
Boxers at the 1984 Summer Olympics
Place of birth missing (living people)
Heavyweight boxers